The 2019 Ontario Scotties Tournament of Hearts, the provincial women's curling championship for Southern Ontario, was held January 28 to February 2 at the Woolwich Memorial Centre in Elmira, Ontario. The winning team of skip Rachel Homan, third Emma Miskew, second Joanne Courtney and lead Lisa Weagle represented Ontario at the 2019 Scotties Tournament of Hearts in Sydney, Nova Scotia, finishing second. Homan defeated Julie Tippin in the final with a final score of 7-5. The event was held in conjunction with the 2019 Ontario Tankard, the men's provincial championship. This was the sixth time the team played at the Scotties and the fourth time representing Ontario.

Unlike the 2018 event, the 2019 Scotties returned to having a round robin format.

Qualification process
Eight teams qualified from two cash spiels (two each), an open qualifier (two teams), plus the top two southern Ontario teams in the CTRS standings (as of December 9, 2018).

Teams
The team lineups were as follows:

Round robin standings

Round robin results

Draw 4
January 28, 8:00 pm

Draw 5
January 29, 9:30 am

Draw 7
January 29, 7:30 pm

Draw 8
January 30, 9:30 am

Draw 9
January 30, 2:30 pm

Draw 10
January 30, 7:30 pm

Draw 11
January 31, 9:30 am

Draw 12
January 31, 2:30 pm

Draw 13
January 31, 7:30 pm

Draw 14
February 1, 9:30 am

Draw 15
February 1, 2:30 pm

Tiebreaker
February 1, 7:30 pm

Playoffs

Semifinal
February 2, 9:30 am

Final
February 2, 7:00 pm

Qualification

Cash Spiel #1
December 14–16, Midland Curling Club, Midland

Tiebreaker
Wasylkiw 7, Peters 5

Cash Spiel #2
January 4–6, 2019, Leaside Curling Club, East York, Toronto

Open qualifier
January 11–13, 2019, Niagara Falls Curling Club, Niagara Falls

References

Ontario Scotties Tournament of Hearts
Woolwich, Ontario
Ontario Scotties Tournament of Hearts
Ontario Scotties Tournament of Hearts
Ontario Scotties Tournament of Hearts
Ontario Scotties Tournament of Hearts
Sport in the Regional Municipality of Waterloo